Kerstin Krause (born 28 January 1959) is a German diver. She competed at the 1976 Summer Olympics and the 1980 Summer Olympics.

References

External links
 

1959 births
Living people
German female divers
Olympic divers of East Germany
Divers at the 1976 Summer Olympics
Divers at the 1980 Summer Olympics
People from Perleberg
Sportspeople from Brandenburg
20th-century German women